SpaceX CRS-25, also known as SpX-25, was a Commercial Resupply Service mission (CRS) to the International Space Station (ISS) that was launched on 15 July 2022. The vehicle delivered supplies to the crew aboard the ISS along with multiple pieces of equipment that will be used to conduct multiple research investigations aboard the ISS.

The launch of CRS-25 was delayed to July 11 to investigate issues in the Dragon's propulsion system detected during pre-launch testing. The previously scheduled launch date was June 10.

Mission overview

Objective 
SpX-25 was a Commercial Resupply Service mission to the International Space Station (ISS). This flight was the 25th resupply flight of cargo sent to the International Space Station.

Timeline 
SpX-25 was launched on July 15, 2022 (0:44 Universal Time) on a SpaceX Falcon 9 rocket from the Kennedy Space Center in Florida. Dragon arrived at ISS on July 16, 2022. The SpX-25 mission lasted 36 days, 18 hours and 9 minutes, coming down off the Florida coast on August 20, 2022.

Delay 
According to NASA, elevated levels of monomethyl hydrazine (MMH) vapor were detected in the spacecraft’s propulsion system, causing the launch mission to be delayed for repairs. The entire affected area of the spacecraft was removed and investigated before proceeding with the launch.

Cargo Dragon 
The Cargo Dragon is a cargo spacecraft designed by SpaceX, and it is currently the only spacecraft capable of not only sending cargo into space but also returning cargo back to Earth. It utilizes the Falcon 9 rocket as its launch vehicle which detaches from the Dragon once it reaches orbit.

Re-usability 
This is the third flight of the particular Cargo Dragon unitto space and SpaceX’s 25th commercial resupply mission. The Falcon 9 was used to launch SpX-25 into space and is also partially reusable. Various parts of the Falcon 9 are recoverable and relaunched for future supply missions. The Cargo Dragon spacecraft itself is preserved by the parachute-assisted splashdown technique allowing boats to retrieve and reuse parts. Recycling parts of Cargo Dragon and Falcon 9 significantly minimizes the cost to launch crafts into space and optimizes resources for future missions.

Cargo details 

== Research contributions ==
Four significant studies on board SpX-25 were delivered and researched at the ISS:

Earth's dust patterns 
As part of the SpX-25 resupply mission, NASA's Jet Propulsion Laboratory (JPL) developed Earth Surface Mineral Dust Source Investigation (EMIT) in order to track the mineral composition of dust on the arid regions of Earth. Dust can have a cooling effect or heating effect depending on its mineral composition. EMIT is a 1-year investigation that will collect images to track and generate maps of dust patterns and provide insight into the local, regional, or global effects of dust as it travels through the atmosphere.

Immune system aging 
Immunosenescence is the dysfunction and change of the immune system of the elderly and it occurs as a natural part of the aging process. This process is linked to a higher propensity to infection, a higher risk of autoimmune disorders, and an increased risk of malignancies such as cancer. The ISS is conducting research on how microgravity in space might negatively affect these processes to better understand immune system aging and develop treatments to protect astronauts from the possible  of microgravity. Additionally, microgravity provides a medium to study immune system aging at an accelerated rate, making it a helpful tool to study immune system aging and find applications on Earth.

CubeSats 
CubeSats are a category of research spacecraft called nano-satellites. A CubeSat allows small satellite cargo to fly on rockets headed to space. CubeSats involve small experiments that can be small and inexpensive to build and launch. Their compact functionality broadens accessibility to spacial research and technology development to students, universities, and other related initiatives.

Genes in space 
This is one of many experiment launches sent to the ISS on board SpX-25. This study will observe the process of cell-free protein production in microgravity. This study is conducted without the use of living cells and is carried out by using biosensors to detect particular target molecules present in the cell. The success of this study would create low-resource, portable, and low-cost technology for medical applications.

European Space Agency (ESA) research and activities  
 ESA's BIOFILMS (Biofilm Inhibition On Flight equipment and on board the ISS using microbiologically Lethal Metal Surfaces) experiment investigating bacterial biofilm formation and antimicrobial properties of different metal surfaces under spaceflight conditions in altered gravity

References

External links 
 NASA
 SpaceX official page for the Dragon spacecraft
 Government of Malta Press Release
 European Space Agency (ESA)

SpaceX Dragon 2
SpaceX payloads contracted by NASA
Supply vehicles for the International Space Station
Spacecraft launched in 2022
2022 in the United States
Spacecraft which reentered in 2022